Stratha'an or Strathavon is the valley of the River Avon, locally called the River A'an, in the Strathspey area of Moray, Scotland. Stratha'an was a provincial lordship first recorded between 1194 and 1198, that was coextensive with the parishes of Kirkmichael and Inveravon.

The Lordship of Stratha'an may have been acquired c. 1190 by Earl Duncan of Fife, and commemorated by the naming of Ben Macdui on the lordship's western boundary after the Earl's kindred Clan MacDuff, though the existence of a burn called Allt an Gille Mícheil on the south eastern boundary of the lordship may commemorate the earlier Earl Gille Míchéil, suggesting the lordship may have been associated with the Earls of Fife as early as the period of the defeat of Oengus of Moray at the Battle of Stracathro in 1130. The relationship between the lordship and the Earls of Fife was certainly well-established by 1214, when Earl Malcolm granted the church of St. Peter of Inveravon to the Diocese of Moray "with all the parish of the whole of Stratha'an", and the Earls' lordship was described as being held "in ancient times" in a charter of Robert I dated between 1315 and 1329.

References

Bibliography
 
 

Provincial lordships of Scotland